Unnai Solli Kutramillai i a 1990 Indian Tamil-language film, directed by Ameerjan, starring Karthik and Sithara. The film, produced by Kavithalayaa Productions, was released on 17 March 1990.

Plot 

Balu is a graduate youth who came from his village to town, who wants to become rich. He works as a police informer and falls in love with Janaki, the daughter of Inspector Veerapandian. Veerapandian asks Balu to watch his daughter closely, to see if she had a boyfriend. In the same time, Veerapandian's enemy Kumar tries to kidnap her daughter, they fail due to his opposition. Balu finds an illegal drug trade and his house's owner was sent to jail, then his all family commits suicide. Veerapandian is promoted as assistant commissioner and Balu resigns his job. One day, Veerapandian finds Balu in a crime scene and asks him to say identify the killer, but he refuses. Even after being tortured, he says nothing. After being released from prison, he cannot find a job. Baby is killed and Balu decides to steal the money from the criminals. Balu becomes rich and Kumar falls in love with Balu's sister Parvathi. Balu was later arrested by Veerapandian and brutally tortured by the police in prison. Kumar refuses Balu's sisters request to save Balu, his sister realises that she has been cheated by Kumar and Kumar kills her. Janaki tells that the culprit is Darmaraj and Veerapandian releases him. Balu kills Kumar and Darmaraj to revenge his sister death.

Cast 

Karthik as Balu "informer"
Sithara as Janaki
Radha Ravi as Veerapandian
Nassar as Kumar
Charle as Durai
Kuyili as Baby
Vadivukkarasi as Balu's mother
Shihan Hussaini as Dharmaraj

Soundtrack 
The film score and the soundtrack were composed by Ilaiyaraaja, with lyrics written by Vaali.

Reception 
The film received mixed recognition and was a moderate success at the box office.

References

External links 

1990 films
1990s Tamil-language films
Films directed by Ameerjan
Films scored by Ilaiyaraaja
Films with screenplays by Crazy Mohan